Oksana Anatolyevna Mysina (born 15 March 1961, Donetsk Oblast, Ukraine, USSR) is an actor, director and musician. She has been described by The New York Times theatre critic Margo Jefferson as one of Russia's greatest actors. She is the founder, lead singer, violinist, and lyricist for the rock band Oxy Rocks.

Personal life
Oksana Mysina was born and lived in the Donbas region of Ukraine for the first eight years of her life. Her father Anatoly Vladimirovich Mysin, later to be a mining engineer, and her mother Lidia Grigoryevna Mysina (Bratus), subsequently a seismologist, grew up and were married in the Ukrainian city of Dnepropetrovsk (now Dnipro). Oksana credits both parents with giving her the necessary actor's sensibilities: "My irrepressible temperament is from my mother. My father... was a very emotional person." Oksana's sister Marina Yakut (Mysina), three years her elder, was a young talent on the violin and a teacher told the girls' parents that Marina needed to study in Moscow. As Mysina told the audience during a performance in Yekaterinburg in April 2019, the teacher "told my parents: 'Immediately! Immediately to Moscow! I've never had such a talent.' And they took me along too." The family moved to Moscow in 1969 where Oksana and Marina both studied violin and viola at the Gnesin School of Music. "I was admitted to Gnesinka in the hopes that I would be Marina No. 2," Oksana said in 2004. But Oksana had dreamed of acting since childhood, and, while still studying at the Gnesin School, she joined a well-known youth theater: "While still studying [violin], I worked with Vyacheslav Spesivtsev at the then-super popular Krasnaya Presnya Youth Theater." She subsequently studied professionally at the Shchepkin Institute of the Maly Theater under the famed Mikhail Tsaryov, who had acted for Vsevolod Meyerhold in the 1930s. She joined her first professional company, the Spartacus Square Theater-studio in 1986.

Oksana married American writer and translator John Freedman in 1989. They lived in Moscow until November 2018 when they relocated to Greece.

Stage
Mysina was a member of the Spartacus Square Theater-studio (known as Theater Moderne since 1995) from 1986 to 1994. During this tenure she achieved her first international exposure, performing the title role in Lyudmila Razumovskaya's play Dear Yelena Sergeevna on tours to the BITEF festival in Serbia in 1989, and Chicago and Los Angeles in 1990. She began working independently at various Moscow theaters, starting at the Novy Drama Theater, where she performed from 1993 to 2000, and the Theater of Young Spectators (MTYuZ), where she performed from 1994 to 2020.

Mysina's starring role at MTYuZ as Katerina Ivanovna in Kama Ginkas's 1994 Moscow production of his son Daniil Gink's play K. I. from Crime, a 90-minute monologue adapted from Fyodor Dostoyevsky's Crime and Punishment was acclaimed as the best production of the Moscow season. "Critics widely agreed [that she] rose to the creative heights demanded by Dostoevsky." In tours around the world, she took the role to the Grotowski Center in Wroclaw, Poland, in 1995, the Avignon Festival, France, in 1997, the Belgrade International Theater Festival (BITEF) in Belgrade, Yugoslavia, in 2000, the Midwinter Night's Festival in Tallinn, Estonia, 2000, the Mikhail Tumanishvili International Arts Festival in Tbilisi, Georgia, in 2002, Bard SummerScape in Annandale-on-Hudson, New York in 2003 the Foundry Theater on Off-Broadway in New York City in 2005, on a three-city tour of Brazil in 2006, and elsewhere.

Mysina worked with many top theater directors, including Boris Lvov-Anokhin (Novy Drama Theater, 1993–2001), Vladimir Mirzoyev (Stanislavsky Drama Theater, 1997), Roman Kozak (Moscow Art Theater and Pushkin Drama Theater, 1997–2000), Oleg Menshikov (814 Theater Association, 2000–01), Dmitry Krymov (School of Dramatic Art, 2010–2018), as well as in the professional debut of Zhenya Berkovich (Kirill Serebrennikov's Seventh Studio at Winzavod, 2011). She founded her own theater, the Oksana Mysina Theatrical Brotherhood (2001-2010), directing and acting in two plays by Viktor Korkiya, Don Quixote and Sancho Panza on the Island of Taganrog, and Ariston, based on the myth of Oedipus. She was the first performer in roles of plays by numerous contemporary playwrights, including Lyudmila Razumovskaya, Yevgeny Kozlovsky, Alexei Kazantsev, Maksym Kurochkin, Korkiya, Alexander Chugunov, Vadim Levanov, Klim (pseudonym of Vladimir Klimenko), and Kira Malinina.

Television
For her performance in Yelena Tsyplakova's 23-part miniseriesFamily Secrets (2001), Mysina received a Spolokhi award for best actress. Her performance in "The Other Mask" episode of the original Kamenskaya TV mini-series is recognized as a small masterpiece. In Oleg Babitsky and Yury Goldin's television movie of Mikhail Bulgakov's Theatrical Novel (2003), she offered an eccentric interpretation of Polixena. Her performance as Elzbieta in Alexei Zernov's ironic TV mini-series All or Nothing was first aired in 2004. Mysina performed the lead in Arkady Sirenko's made-for TV movie Wilting-Failing, based on stories by Vasily Shukshin (2004). She performed in Andrei Eshpai, Jr.'s TV mini-series of Anatoly Rybakov's novel The Children of the Arbat (2004) and in Yury Kara's Star of the Age (2005) in which she played the legendary Russian actress Serafima Birman.

Film
For her performance in Vadim Abdrashitov's A Play for a Passenger (1995) Mysina received a Golden Ram award for best debut. Her performance as the Empress Marya Fyodorovna in Vitaly Melnikov's Poor Poor Paul (2003), a cinematic biography about Russian Tsar Pavel I, has been recognized for excellence on several fronts. It brought her awards at the 14th annual Vera Kholodnaya Women of Film festival, the Vivat, Russian Cinema festival, and the Artek International Children's Film Festival, all in 2004. For this role, she was nominated for a Nika Award (considered the Russian Oscar) as the Best Supporting Actress. She played the tragicomic role Hans Christian Andersen's mother Anna-Maria in Eldar Ryazanov's Andersen (2007).  In 2012, she won the Special President's Prize at the 10th annual Amur Autumn Russian Film and Theater Festival in Blagoveshchensk, Russia, for her performance of the Poetess in Vitaly Melnikov's film The Admirer.

After relocating to Greece, Mysina actively began directing experimental short and feature films for her own Free Flight Films production company. Her six releases as of January 2023 have enjoyed success at international film festivals (see Film Awards and Nominations below).

Oksana Mysina and Oxy Rocks
Mysina fronted the rock band Oksana Mysina and Oxy Rocks from 2003 until 2018. Oksana was the band's vocalist, electric violinist and lyricist. The music for most of their songs was written by bassist Dmitry Yershov or lead guitarist Sergei Shchetinin. Oxy Rock's Russian-language cover of Bob Dylan's "Things Have Changed" has been played by legendary Philadelphia DJ Michael Tearson several times on his World Wide Dylan in Translations shows, most recently in 2022, where, as the show ended, he commented, "I love how Oksana did that!" (No. 36/248 on radiothatdoesn'tsuck.com). In 2012 Ainars Virga, the leader of famed Latvian band Līvi, joined Oxy Rocks for a series of concerts in Moscow. Mysina has incorporated several of her band's songs into her films, including the song "Ivan Petrovich" in Ivan Petrovich, "World on Edge," "The Last Drop" and others in Red, Blue, and Asya, and "Blues-Rock Mood" in Voices of the New Belarus.

Political views and activity
Oksana Mysina has repeatedly taken part in mass protests, including the public demonstrations titled "For Fair Elections", "March Against Scoundrels" and "March of Peace". She was the emcee of the "March of Truth" rally in 2014 and of Alexei Navalny's "For the Change of Power" rally in 2015. She advocated the release of the defendants in the Bolotnaya case and members of the Pussy Riot group. She participated in the work of the "Congress of Intelligentsia Against the War, Russia's Self-Isolation and the Restoration of Totalitarianism." She supported Alexei Navalny in Moscow's mayoral election in 2013, and has frequently spoken out against the persecution of Russian historian Yury A. Dmitriev. In December 2021 she organized and hosted an online marathon of prominent public figures speaking in defense of Yury A. Dmitriev.

In 2011, the actress signed the "Open Letter to Cultural Figures," opposing the presidential candidacy of Vladimir Putin. In March 2014, along with a number of other figures in the fields of science and culture, she expressed her opposition to Russia's annexation of Crimea. In May of the same year, together with other participants in a discussion platform titled "Round Table on 12 December", she issued a "Statement on the situation in the country, the responsibility of civil society and political elites", which declared that Russia was in "a transition to a fascist-type totalitarian regime is taking place".

Four of Mysina's films have been expressions of her political views: Insulted. Belarus (2020), based on a play by Andrei Kureichik, exposed the horrors of the failed Minsk Revolution in 2020 (2020-2021 Belarusian protests); Voices of the New Belarus (2021), based on a verbatim play by Andrei Kureichik about imprisoned Belarusian protesters, features a performance by Russian politician Ilya Yashin who, himself, was sentenced to eight years in prison in December 2022; Escape (2022) a true-life film short about a refugee from the war in Ukraine; and Love is Stronger than Fear (2022), a short version of Voices of the New Belarus.

Credits

Theater, acting
1. 1979 – I Came to Give you Freedom by Vasily Shukshin, dir. by Vyacheslav Spesivtsev, Moscow Krasnaya Presnya Youth Theater. Hysterical Woman, violinist

2. 1980 – Sadko, a Russian legend, dir. by Vyacheslav Spesivtsev, Moscow Krasnaya Presnya Youth Theater. The Phoenix

3. 1987 – Dear Yelena Sergeyevna by Lyudmila Razumovskaya, dir. by Svetlana Vragova, Moscow Spartacus Square Theater-studio. Yelena Sergeyevna

4. 1988 – Personals! a devised performance, dir. by Svetlana Vragova, Moscow Spartacus Square Theater-studio. Various

5. 1991 – Video: Box: Cell after Yevgeny Kozlovsky, dir. by Svetlana Vragova, Moscow Spartacus Square Theater-studio. Vera

6. 1992 – Rasplyuyev's Joyous Days after Alexander Sukhovo-Kobylin, dir. by Svetlana Vragova, Moscow Spartacus Square Theater-studio. Brandakhlystova

7. 1993 – The Aspern Papers by Michael Redgrave (adapted from the Henry James story), dir. by Boris Lvov-Anokhin, Moscow New Drama Theater. Tina

8. 1994 – K.I. from "Crime" by Daniil Gink (adapted from Fyodor Dostoevsky's Crime and Punishment), dir. by Kama Ginkas, Moscow Young Spectator Theater. Katerina Ivanovna (K.I.)

9. 1995 – A Heroic Comedy, or the Whims of Madame de Staël by Ferdinand Bruckner, dir. by Boris Lvov-Anokhin, Moscow New Drama Theatre. Germaine de Staël

10. 1996 – The Queen's Revenge, or, the Novellas of Margaret of Navarre by Eugène Scribe and Ernest Legouvé, dir. by Boris Lvov-Anokhin, Moscow New Drama Theatre. Margaret of Navarre

11. 1997 – That, This Other World by Alexei Kazantsev, dir. by Vladimir Mirzoev, Moscow Stanislavsky Drama Theater. 

12. 1997 (joined cast) – Teibele and her Demon by Eve Friedman and Isaac Bashevis Singer, dir. by Vyacheslav Dolgachyov, Chekhov Moscow Art Theater. Teibele

13. 1999 – Moscow Stories of Love and Marriage by Alexander Ostrovsky, dir. by Boris Lvov-Anokhin, Moscow New Drama Theatre. Serafima Karpovna

14. 1999 – The Main Thing by Nikolai Evreinov, dir. by Roman Kozak, Chekhov Moscow Art Theater. Barefoot Dancer

15. 2000 – Kitchen by Maksym Kurochkin, dir. by Oleg Menshikov, 814 Theatrical Association. Kriemhilde/Washerwoman

16. 2001 – Quixote and Sancho by Viktor Korkiya, dir. by Oksana Mysina, Oksana Mysina Theatrical Brotherhood. Sancho Panza

17. 2002 – The Black Prince by Iris Murdoch, dir. by Roman Kozak, Moscow Pushkin Drama Theatre. Rachel Baffin

18. 2005 (joined cast) – Ariston by Viktor Korkiya, dir. by Oksana Mysina, Oksana Mysina Theatrical Brotherhood. Jocasta

19. 2005 – The King of Sins and Queen of Fears after Witold Gombrowicz, dir. by Yury Urnov, Theater of Nations. Margaret, the Queen of Fears

20. 2006 – Libido by Alexander Chugunov, dir. by Alexander Ogaryov, Ecumene Theater House. Inna

21. 2008 – Dead Man's Cell Phone by Sarah Ruhl, dir. by Yury Urnov, commercial production. Mrs. Harriet Gottlieb

22. 2010 – Tararabumbia a devised performance based on Chekhovian themes, dir. by Dmitry Krymov, School of Dramatic Art. Ranevskaya and other Chekhov heroines

23. 2010 – The Imaginary Operetta by Valère Novarina, dir. by Christophe Feutrier, School of Dramatic Art. Narrator

24. 2011 (joined cast) – The Auction based on Chekhovian themes, School of Dramatic Art, dir. by Dmitry Krymov. Ranevskaya and other Chekhovian heroines

25. 2011 – Gerontophobia by Vadim Levanov, dir. by Zhenya Berkovich, Kirill Serebrennikov's Seventh Studio at Winzavod. The Actress

26. 2011 – The Theater of Medea by Klim, dir. by Vladimir Berzin, School of Dramatic Art. Medea

27. 2013 – I Demand the Floor by Kira Malinina (based on a screenplay by Gleb Panfilov), dir. by Gleb Cherepanov, Kirill Serebrennikov's Creative Laboratory at the Russian Theater Union. Yelizaveta Uvarova

28. 2015 – Russian Blues. Hunting for Mushrooms a devised performance, dir. by Dmitry Krymov, School of Dramatic Art. The Neighbor

29. 2017 – The Cherry Orchard by Anton Chekhov, dir. by Alexander Vlasov, Anton Chekhov Museum, Moscow. Lyubov Ranevskaya

30. 2018 – Αλέ! Αλέ! Αλέ! (Hey! Hey! Hey!) written and dir. by Ketty Koraka, Odeon Theater, Chania, Crete (Greece). Various

31. 2019 – Παραμύθια τούμπανα! (Fairytale Drums!) written and dir. by Ketty Koraka, Odeon Theater, Chania, Crete (Greece). Various

32. 2021 – Yes I Will Yes! (Molly's monologue from James Joyce's Ulysses), dir. by Nikolai Berman, Andrei Voznesensky Center, Moscow. Live stream on YouTube. Molly Bloom

Theater, directing 
1. 2001 – Quixote and Sancho by Viktor Korkiya, Oksana Mysina Theatrical Brotherhood.

2. 2003 – A Family Evening by Andrei Kureichik, OPEN FORMAT festival, Minsk, Belarus.

3. 2004 – Ariston by Viktor Korkiya, Oksana Mysina Theatrical Brotherhood.

Theater awards and nominations
1. 1995 – Moskovsky Komsomolets Prize for K.I. from 'Crime2. 1996 – Nominated for a Golden Mask award for Best Actress, Golden Mask Festival, Moscow, for performance of K.I. in K.I. from 'Crime'''

3. 2000 – Special Prize for performance in K.I. from 'Crime at the Belgrade International Theater Festival (BITEF).

4. 2000 – Smoktunovsky Prize for her performance of Serafima Karpovna in the play Moscow Stories of Love and Marriage.

5. 2011 – Best One-Actor Show at the Christmas Parade Festival (St. Petersburg) for her performance of Medea in Theater of Medea.

Film and television, acting
1. 1987 – Time to Fly, dir. by Alexei Sakharov – Woman on duty2. 1987 – Habitat, dir. by Lev Tsutsulkovsky – Oksana, violinist3. 1988 – Miss Millionairess, dir. by Alexander Rogozhkin – Galya4. 1988 – The Birthday (after the play Dear Yelena Sergeyevna), dir. by Svetlana Vragova and Andrei Nikishin – Yelena Sergeyevna5. 1991 – $1,000 One-way Ticket, dir. by Alexander Surin – Natalya's friend6. 1991 – The Leg, dir. by Nikita Tyagunov – Anzhelika7. 1992 – The Money Changers, dir. by Georgy Shengeliya – Elena Grakina8. 1993 – Silhouette in the Opposite Window, dir. by Rein Liblik – Nyuka9. 1995 – A Play for a Passenger, dir. by Vadim Abdrashitov – Inna, Oleg's lodger10. 2000 – Kamenskaya 1 (film No. 7 "Another's Mask"), dir. by Yury Moroz – Larisa Isichenko11. 2001 – Family Secrets (23 series), dir. by Yelena Tsyplakova – Tatyana Yermakova12. 2001 – Private Eyes (films 7 & 10), dir. by Vladimir Krasnopolsky and Valery Uskov – Oksana, wife of Yegor Nemigailo13. 2002 – Wilting-Failing (film No. 6 in the Shukshin's Stories series), dir. Arkady Sirenko – Nina14. 2002 – Theatrical Novel, dir. by Oleg Babitsky and Yury Goldin – Poliksena Vasilievna Toropetskaya15. 2003 – Poor, Poor Pavel, dir. by Vitaly Melnikov – Maria Fyodorovna, Empress16. 2003 – All or Nothing (16 series), dir. by Alexei Zernov – Elzbieta Krzyzanowska17. 2004 – Children of the Arbat, dir. by Andrei Eshpai, Jr. – Zvyaguro18. 2005 – Star of the Age, dir. by Yury Kara – Serafima Birman, Soviet actress19. 2006 – Andersen. Life without Love, dir. by Eldar Ryazanov – Anna Maria, mother of Hans Christian Andersen20. 2007 – The Journey, dir. by Vladimir Kharchenko-Kulikovsky – Anya

21. 2007 – Bloody Mary, dir. by Nonna Agadzhanova – Albina

22. 2007 – The 'Kill the Enemy' Agit-Brigade! dir. by Vitaly Melnikov – Serafima Ivanovna, pioneer leader23. 2008 – The Big Waltz (an unfinished film by Vladimir Menshov)

24. 2008 – Lessons in Seduction, dir. by Alexei Lisovets – Alla25. 2009 – Bravo, Laurencia! dir. by Nadezhda Ptushkina –  Elya26. 2010 – Guardians of the Internet, dir. by Dmitry Matov – Lidia Konstantinovna, business woman27. 2012 – The Admirer, dir. by Vitaly Melnikov – The Poetess28. 2013 – Past and Gone (documentary), dir. by Mikhail Ugarov – Yelena Mizulina29. 2014 – Two Fathers and Two Sons 2 (episode No. 30), dir. by Radda Novikova – Antonina Vsevolodovna Makhnach, psychologist30. 2014 – Tatiana's Night, dir. by Viktor Buturlin – Tamara, first wife of Alexander Ivanovich Golubei31. 2014 – The Wonderworker, dir. by Dmitry Konstantinov – Unfortunate woman32. 2017 – Listen! An Evening with Oksana Mysina at the Moscow International House of Music – reading poems by Alexander Timofeevsky, Viktor Korkiya, Shakespeare, Vladimir Mayakovsky, Nikolai Erdman, Vladimir Mass, etc.33. 2018 – Shuttle Traders-2, dir. by Sergei Krasnov and Yulia Krasnova – Alla Ivanovna34. 2018 – The Bonus, dir. by Valerya Gai Germanika – Gashik's mother35. 2019 – The Roller Coaster, dir. by Aleko Tsabadze – Valentina Stepanovna, psychiatristFilm and television, miscellaneous performances
1. 2006 – Erdman and Stepanova: a Double Portrait in the Interior of an Era (documentary), dir. by Galina Yevtushenko – voice of Angelina Stepanova2. 2006 – The Tulse Luper Suitcases. Russian version, dir. Peter Greenaway – dubbed voice for character Mrs. Haps-Mills3. 2010 – Model for a Genius (documentary about Lydia Delektorskaya, muse to Henri Matisse), dir. by Olesya Fokina – voice of Lydia Delektorskaya4. 2012 – I Long Have Walked a Straight Line (documentary about Irina Antonova, art historian and director of the Pushkin State Museum of Fine Arts), dir. by Olesya Fokina – voice of Irina Antonova5. 2014 – Whisper. The Silver Age (a short film dedicated to figures of the Silver Age and the period of Young Symbolism), dir. by Konstantin Olonovsky) – poetry recitals6. 2017 – Just a Handful of Ashes in my Hand (documentary about Russian poet Marina Tsvetaeva), dir. by Olesya Fokina – poetry recitalsFilm, directing
1. 2020 – Insulted. Belarus, screenplay by Andrei Kureichik, full-length film.

2. 2021 – Red, Blue and Asya, based on O. Henry's "The Purple Dress," short film.

3. 2021 – Ivan Petrovich, based on monologues from Nikolai Erdman's play The Suicide, short film.

4. 2021 – Voices of the New Belarus, screenplay by Andrei Kureichik, full-length film.

5. 2022 – Escape, a real-life short about a family escaping to Europe after the Russian invasion of Europe.

6. 2022 – Love is Stronger than Fear, a short version of Voices of the New Belarus, scripted by Andrei Kureichik.

Film awards and nominations
1. 1995 – Golden Ram award in the "Hope" category at the Kinotavr film festival for her role as Inna in A Play for a Passenger.

2. 2001 – SPOLOKHI (Flash) award at the III TV Feature-Film Festival in Arkhangelsk for her role as Tatyana Yermakova in Family Secrets.

3. 2004 – I Remember that Wonderful Moment prize at the Vera Kholodnaya Women of Cinema Festival for her performance of Empress Maria Fyodorovna in Poor, Poor Pavel.

4. 2004 – Best Female Role" at the Vivat Cinema of Russia! festival in St. Petersburg for her performance of Empress Maria Fyodorovna in Poor, Poor Pavel.

5. 2004 – Best Actress at the Artek XII International Children's Film Festival for her performance of Empress Maria Fyodorovna in Poor, Poor Pavel.

6. 2004 – Nomination for the Nika Award in the Best Supporting Actress category for her performance of Empress Maria Fyodorovna in Poor, Poor Pavel.

7. 2012 – Special President's Prize at 10th annual Amur Autumn Russian Film and Theater Festival in Blagoveshchensk, Russia, for her performance of the Poetess in The Admirer.

8. 2021 – Stockholm City Film Festival selects Ivan Petrovich as a Semi-finalist.

9. 2021 – London Director Awards selects Insulted. Belarus as a Finalist.

10. 2021 – Best Female Actress Award selects Marina Kangelary as a Finalist for her performance in Red, Blue, and Asya.

11. 2021 – Boden International Film Festival selects Insulted. Belarus as a Semi-finalist.

12. 2021 – New York Cinematography Awards selects Red, Blue, and Asya as a Semi-finalist.

13. 2021 – Prague International Film Awards selects Red, Blue, and Asya as a Finalist.

14. 2021 – Best Shorts Competition (San Diego) bestows an Award of Recognition on Red, Blue, and Asya.

15. 2021 – Art Film Awards (Skopje) bestows an Honorable Mention (2nd Place) on Red, Blue, and Asya.

16. 2021 – Art Film Awards (Skopje) names Insulted. Belarus Best Experimental Film.

17. 2021 – Blow-Up Arthouse Film Fest (Chicago) selects Red, Blue, and Asya as a Semi-finalist.

18. 2022 – Symbiotic Film Festival (Kyiv) selects Red, Blue, and Asya as a Nominee.

20. 2022 – Iconic Images Film Festival (Vilnius) selects Oksana Mysina Best Female Director for Red, Blue, and Asya.

21. 2022 – Iconic Images Film Festival (Vilnius) selects Red, Blue, and Asya as Best Zero Budget Film.

22. 2023 – Atlantis International Internet Short Film Festival (New York) bestows a Grand Prix award on "Love is Stronger than Fear" in the Cinema For Human Rights category.

23. 2023 – Atlantis International Internet Short Film Festival (New York) bestows a Grand Prix award on "Escape" in the Cinema Against War category.

Music videos
1. 2007 – "Potion for Eternal Love," Oksana Mysina and Oxy Rocks perform at Eldar Ryazanov's 80th birthday bash in Moscow. Lyrics by Oksana Mysina, music by Dmitry Yershov. Oxy Rocks is: Oksana Mysina – vocals; Sergei Shchetinin – lead guitar; Dmitry Yershov – bass; Sergei Kuchmenko – keyboards; Grigory Gaberman – drums.

2. 2012 – "The World on Edge," dir. by Konstantin Olonovsky – Oksana Mysina and Oxy Rocks. Lyrics by Oksana Mysina, music by Dmitry Yershov. Mix by Valery Cherkesov. Oxy Rocks is: Oksana Mysina – vocals; Sergei Shchetinin – lead guitar; Dmitry Yershov – bass; Sergei Kuchmenko – keyboards; Grigory Gaberman – drums. Cameraman – Dmitry Shabaldin. Edited by Sergei Tsunaev and Igor Martynov. Actors – Katya Grebenkova and Oleg Gusev.

3. 2012 – "The Sky Above Me," dir. by Konstantin Olonovsky – Oksana Mysina and Oxy Rocks. Lyrics by Oksana Mysina, music by Dmitry Yershov. Mix by Valery Cherkesov. Oxy Rocks is: Oksana Mysina – vocals; Sergei Shchetinin – lead guitar; Dmitry Yershov – bass; Sergei Kuchmenko – keyboards; Grigory Gaberman – drums. Edited by Sergei Tsunaev and Igor Martynov.

Radio
1. 2008 – Dead Souls by Nikolai Gogol, dir. by Viktor Trukhan – Lady, pleasant in all respects.

2. 2010-2015 – Where Words End, a weekly radio program about physically challenged musicians, hosted by Oksana Mysina on Radio Orpheus, Moscow.

3. 2011 – The Blonde by Alexander Volodin, dir. by Dmitry Nikolaev, music by Oksana Mysina and Oxy Rocks – Ira''

References

External links
 

Russian film actresses
Russian stage actresses
Living people
Place of birth missing (living people)
1961 births
Russian radio personalities